Bloody Tales of Disgraced Lands is a debut full-length concept album about the war of the Clan of Cross by the German Viking / pagan metal band Wolfchant. It was released on November 25, 2005 through CCP Records.

Track listing

References

2005 albums
Wolfchant albums